Maccabi Rishon LeZion is a sport club in Rishon LeZion, Israel.

The professional teams associated with it include:

Maccabi Rishon LeZion (basketball)
Maccabi Rishon LeZion (handball)
Maccabi Rishon LeZion (badminton)

There was also a football section, Maccabi Rishon LeZion F.C., which is now defunct.

Notable members
 Diana Vaisman (born 1998), Belarusian-born Israeli sprinter, national record holder in the 100 metre sprint
Irina Lenskiy, Olympic runner who specializes in the 100 metres hurdles

 
Multi-sport clubs in Israel
Sport in Rishon LeZion